Golis may refer to:

 Golis Mountains, Togdheer, Somaliland; a mountain range
 Golis Telecom Somalia, a telecom operator in Puntland, Somalia

See also

 Gollis University, Hargeisa, Somaliland, Somalia
 Gollis, Lyngseidet, Lyngen, Troms og Finnmark, Norway; a tourist attraction
 
 Goli (disambiguation)